The peseta was the currency of Spain between 1868 and 2002. Along with the French franc, it was also a de facto currency used in Andorra (which had no national currency with legal tender).

Etymology 

The name of the currency originally comes from peceta, a Catalan diminutive form of the (Catalan) word peça (lit. piece, i.e. a coin), not from the Spanish peso (lit. weight). Coins denominated in "pesetas" were briefly issued in 1808 in Barcelona under French occupation; see Catalan peseta.

Symbol 
Traditionally, there was never a single symbol or special character for the Spanish peseta. Common abbreviations were "Pta" (plural: "Pts), "Pt", and "Ptas". A common way of representing amounts of pesetas in print was using superior letters: "Pta" and "Pts".

Common Spanish models of mechanical typewriters had the expression "Pts" on a single type head, as a shorthand intended to fill a single type space in tables instead of three.

Later, Spanish models of IBM electric typewriters also included the same type in its repertoire.

When the first IBM PC was designed in 1980, it included a "peseta symbol" "Pt" in the ROM of the Monochrome Display Adapter (MDA) and Color Graphics Adapter (CGA) video output cards' hardware, with the code number 158. This original character set chart later became the MS-DOS code page 437.  Some spreadsheet software for PC under MS-DOS, as Lotus 1-2-3, employed this character as the peseta symbol in their Spanish editions.  Subsequent international MS-DOS code pages, like code page 850 and others, deprecated this character in favour of some other national characters.

In order to guarantee the interchange with previous encodings such as code page 437, the international standard Unicode includes this character as U+20A7 PESETA SIGN in its Currency Symbols block. Other than that, the use of the "peseta symbol" standalone is extremely rare, and has been outdated since the adoption of the euro in Spain.

In the version 1.0 of Unicode the character ₧ U+20A7 PESETA SIGN had two reference glyphs: a "Pts" ligature glyph as in IBM code page 437 and an erroneous P with stroke. In Unicode 2.0 the reference glyph P with stroke was erroneously displayed as the only symbol for peseta and was later corrected to the Pts ligature and a separate character code was added for the peso sign.

Subdivision
The peseta was subdivided into 100 céntimos or, informally, 4 reales. The last coin of any value under one peseta was a 50 cts coin issued in 1980 to celebrate Spain's hosting of the 1982 FIFA World Cup. The last 25-céntimo coin (or real) was dated 1959, the ten céntimos also dated 1959; both coins bore the portrait of Franco. The 1-céntimo coin was last minted in 1913 and featured King Alfonso XIII. The -céntimo coin was last minted in 1868 and featured Queen Isabel II.

History 

Currencies used in Spain before the peseta's introduction in 1868 include:
 The maravedí from the 11th to 15th centuries.
 The original Spanish real (later, real nacional) introduced in the mid-14th century, which from 1497 was fixed at 34 maravedíes. Eight of these reales nacional were equal to the Spanish dollar, or peso, or duro.
 The real provincial, used only in Peninsular Spain and not its colonies, and valued at  dollar.
 The real de vellón, another version of the real also exclusive to Peninsular Spain, issued prolifically in the 17th and 18th centuries, and valued much less than the above-mentioned reales. In 1737 it was finally fixed at th dollar. In 1850 it was divided decimally into 10 décimos or 100 céntimos.
 The short-lived silver escudo from 1864 to 1869, worth  dollar and divided into 10 reales de vellón or 100 céntimos de escudo.

The peseta, previously not a monetary unit but a colloquial name for the coin worth  of a peso, was formally introduced as a currency unit in 1868, at a time when Spain considered joining the Latin Monetary Union (LMU). Spain eventually decided not to formally join the LMU, although it did achieve alignment with the bloc. The Spanish Law of June 26, 1864 decreed that in preparation for joining the Latin Monetary Union (set up in 1865), the peseta became a subdivision of the Spanish peso with 1 peso duro = 5 pesetas. The peseta replaced all previous currencies denominated in silver escudos and reales de vellón at a rate of 5 pesetas = 1 peso duro = 2 silver escudos = 20 reales de vellón.

The peseta was equal to 4.5 grams of silver, or 0.290322 grams of gold, the standard used by all the currencies of the Latin Monetary Union. From 1873, only the gold standard applied.

In 1883 the peseta went off the gold standard and traded below parity with the gold French franc. However, as the free minting of silver was suspended to the general public, the peseta had a floating exchange rate between the value of the gold franc and the silver franc. The Spanish government captured all profits from minting duros (5-peseta coins) out of silver bought for less than Pts 5. While total issuance was limited to prevent the peseta from falling below the silver franc, the abundance of duros in circulation prevented the peseta from returning to par with the gold franc. Spain's system where the silver duro trades at a premium above its metallic value due to relative scarcity is called the fiduciary standard.

The political turbulence of the early twentieth century (especially during the years after the World War I) caused the monetary union to break up, although it was not until 1927 that it officially ended.

During the Civil War (1936-1939), gold and silver coinage was withdrawn and copper-nickel coins were introduced. In 1959, Spain became part of the Bretton Woods System, pegging the peseta at a value of Pts 60 = US$1. In 1967, the peseta followed the devaluation of sterling, maintaining the exchange rate of Pts 168 = £1 stg. and establishing a new rate of Pts 70 = US$1.

High inflation was constant in Spain from the Civil War until the 1990s. After one century with the Pts 1,000 being the largest note, the Pts 5,000 note was introduced in 1976. A series of coins was issued to commemorate the 1982 FIFA World Cup held in Spain. All the fractional coinage was withdrawn in 1983; at the same time, Pts 2,000 and Pts 10,000 notes were introduced.

Pts 200 and Pts 500 notes were withdrawn in 1992 and replaced by coins, leaving Pts 1,000 as the smallest note. Coins ranged from Pta 1 to Pts 500. In that year, a series of coins commemorating 1992 Summer Olympics in Barcelona and Expo '92 in Seville were issued. Spain was hit heavily by the early 1990s recession and the peseta was devalued three times, the first of them being just after Black Wednesday, plummeting from Pts 100 to Pts 130 per US$1.

All Franco era coinage was withdrawn in 1997. The peseta linked its value with the euro coin on 1 January 1999, and hit rock bottom that year when Pts 200 were required to buy US$1. At the time Euro became a material coin, Pts 185.29 were needed to buy US$1, that is, 1.1743 euros.

The peseta was replaced by the euro in 2002, following the establishment of the euro in 1999. The exchange rate was €1 = Pts 166.386.

Coins 

From 1868 to 1982, a unique dating system for Spanish coins was employed. This would be adopted and sometimes abandoned intermittently during various times, and continued through to be used through the first years of Juan Carlos I's reign. Although a common "authorization date" will be found on virtually all coins of this period on the obverse (front) of each coin, the actual date for many coins can be found inside a small six pointed star, typically on the reverse (back) of each coin, but sometimes the front. Therefore, the obverse date does not always reflect the actual date of mintage but rather a restriking of older obverse coin die designs. So, if the coin date shows 1959 up front but a tiny "64" is depicted in the six pointed star on the back, then the actual date of issue is in fact 1964 rather than the date depicted in front. This dating system would be abandoned in the early 1980s anticipating a one-by-one redesign of each coin denomination.

Decimal coinage of the monarchy 

No coins were issued by the short lived First Republic (1873–1874).

In 1869 and 1870, coins were introduced in denominations of 1, 2, 5, 10, 20, and 50 céntimos, and Pta 1, Pts 2, and Pts 5. The lowest four denominations were struck in copper (replaced by bronze from 1877), with the 20 cts, 50 cts, Pta 1 and Pts 2 struck in .835 silver and the Pts 5 struck in .900 silver. 5 cts and 10 cts coins were quickly nicknamed perra chica (small dog) and perra gorda (fat dog) respectively, as people then were unable to recognize the shape of the lion in them, mistaking it for a dog. The Pts 5 coin was nicknamed duro (hard), referencing the old peso duro. Pts 5 coins were called duros by every generation until the withdrawal of the peseta in 2002, and Spaniards would often informally account in that unit (e.g. using '20 duros' for Pts 100).

Gold Pts 25 coins were introduced in 1876, followed by Pts 10 in 1878. In 1889, Pts 20 coins were introduced, with production of the Pts 25 ceasing. In 1897, a single issue of gold Pts 100 was made. Production of gold coins ceased in 1904, followed by that of silver coins in 1910. The last bronze coins were issued in 1912.

Starting in 1906 a new series of 1 ctm and 2 cts coins were issued in bronze. Due to a number of economic issues these were the only two coins from this series.

Coin production resumed in 1925 with the introduction of cupronickel 25 cts. In 1926, a final issue of silver 50 cts was made, followed by the introduction of a holed version of the 25 cts in 1927.

The Second Republic and Civil War period 

In 1934, the Second Spanish Republic issued its first coins in the denomination of 25 cts and 50 cts and Pta 1. The 25 cts and silver Pta 1 were the same size and composition as the earlier Royal issues, whilst the 50 cts was struck in copper. In 1937 a 5 cts coin was struck in iron and a new Pta 1 in brass. An iron 10 cts coin was also produced in 1938 but never issued into circulation, unknown whether due to its close resemblance to the  5cts or because the government of issue fell before it could be released. All of these replaced symbols and images related to the monarchy.  The brass Pta 1 was sometimes nicknamed La Rubia (The Blonde), as it featured a woman's face in a gold-coloured alloy.

Coins of the Nationalist State and World War II periods 

The Nationalists issued their first official coins in 1937. These were holed 25 cts featuring a rising sun and a clutch of arrows. These coins were minted in Vienna. A smaller copper 25 cts followed in 1938. Following the end of the Civil War in 1939, the victorious Nationalist government introduced aluminium 5 cts and 10 cts in 1940 featuring a conquistador, followed by reduced size aluminium-bronze Pta 1 coins in 1944 featuring the state crest and national symbols.

During the Civil War, a number of local coinages were also issued by both Republican and Nationalist forces. In 1936, the following pieces were issued by the Nationalists:

{|class="wikitable"
!District
!Denominations
|-
|Cazalla de Sierra
|10 cts
|-
|Arahal
|50 cts, Pta 1, Pts 2
|-
|Lora del Río
|25 cts
|-
|Marchena
|25 cts
|-
|La Puebla de Cazalla
|10 cts, 25 cts
|}

The following issues were made by Republican forces in 1937:

{|class="wikitable"
!District
!Denominations
|-
|Arenys de Mar
|50 cts, Pta 1
|-
|Asturias and León
|50 cts, Pts 1, Pts 2
|-
|Euskadi (Basque Country)
|Pta 1, Pts 2
|-
|Ibi
|25 cts, Pta 1
|-
|L'Ametlla del Vallès
|25-, 50 cts, Pta 1
|-
|Menorca
|5-, 10-, 25 cts, Pta 1, Pts 
|-
|Nulles
|5 cts, 10 cts, 25 cts, 50 cts, Pta 1
|-
|Olot
|10 cts
|-
|Santander, Palencia and Burgos
|50 cts, Pta 1
|-
|Segarra de Gaià (currently Santa Coloma de Queralt)
|Pta 1
|}

Franco-era coinage 

The first Pta 1 coins bearing the portrait of Francisco Franco were issued in 1947. Cupro-nickel Pts 5 followed in 1949. In 1949, holed cupro-nickel 50 cts were introduced, followed by aluminium-bronze Pts  in 1954, cupro-nickel Pts 25 and Pts 50 in 1958 and smaller aluminium 10 and 25 céntimos in 1959. Silver Pts 100 were issued between 1966 and 1969, with aluminium 50 céntimos introduced in 1967. In 1966 Franco's profile was redesigned to depict a more recent representation of the leader.

Restoration of democracy 

When Juan Carlos became king, there were a few changes: the replacement of Franco's portrait with that of Juan Carlos on the 50 cts and Pta 1 in 1975 and the addition of a cupro-nickel Pts 100 in 1976. 10 cts coins were discontinued. But there were bigger changes to each coin in 1982. Following this redesign the 50 cts was discontinued, and aluminium replaced aluminium bronze in the Pta 1. A Pts 2 coin was also introduced, featuring a map of Spain, though this denomination never became popular. More importantly, nickel-brass Pts 100 were introduced. The redesign centered around the 1982 FIFA World Cup and depicted football-related themes on the Pta 1, Pts 5, Pts 25, Pts 50, and Pts 100. Shortly afterwards, the large cupronickel Pts 100 was replaced by a smaller aluminium bronze coin, which also replaced the 100 ₧ banknote. A cupronickel Pts 10 was introduced in 1983, a denomination that had not been issued for many decades. This preceded a wholesale redesign in all circulating Spanish coins and abandonment of the "star" dating system. Cupronickel Pts 200 coins were introduced in 1986, followed by aluminium bronze Pts 500 in 1987.

In 1989 the biggest changes came. The size of the Pta 1 coin was significantly reduced. The Pts 2 coin was discontinued. Smaller aluminium bronze Pts 5 were introduced, and reduced aluminium bronze Pts 25 were also introduced which had a hole in the centre. Smaller Pts 50 coins were also issued the same year in cupronickel with the distinct Spanish flower shape that would eventually be used by many countries, most notably the 20-cent coin of the euro. At the same time, the Pts 200 coin was made larger and included an identifiable edge with incuse lettering. In 1999, a laser-etched hologram was added to the Pts 500 coin as a security feature to help discourage counterfeiting. During this period, all coins except the Pta 1 and Pts 500 went through a commemorative redesign each year, in a similar vein to the U.S. State commemorative quarters program, until they were  discontinued in 2001 before the introduction of the euro common currency.

Until 19 June 2001, the following coins were minted by the Spanish Fábrica Nacional de Moneda y Timbre:
{|class="wikitable"
! Value !! Equivalent in euros (€) !! Diameter !! Weight !! Composition
|-
| Pta 1 || 0.006 (0.01) || 14 mm || 0.55 g || Aluminium
|-
| Pts 5 || 0.03 || 17.5 mm || 3 g || Aluminum-bronze
|-
| Pts 10 || 0.06 || 18.5 mm || 4 g || Copper-nickel
|-
| Pts 25 || 0.15 || 19.5 mm || 4.25 g || Aluminum-bronze
|-
| Pts 50 || 0.30 || 20.5 mm || 5.60 g || Copper-nickel
|-
| Pts 100 || 0.60 || 24.5 mm || 9.25 g || Aluminum-bronze
|-
| Pts 200 || 1.20 || 25.5 mm || 10.5 g || Copper-nickel
|-
| Pts 500 || 3.01 || 28 mm || 12 g || Aluminum-bronze
|}

The Pts 50 coins issued between 1990 and 2000 were the first that featured the Spanish flower shape.

Spanish euro coins 

Like all member nations, these coins come in denominations of 1, 2, and 5 cents in copper plated brass, 10, 20, and 50 cents in Nordic gold, and bimetallic 1 and 2 euros with a common reverse design. The obverse of the first three denominations feature Cathedral of Santiago de Compostela, the 10, 20, and 50 cents depict Spanish poet-writer Miguel de Cervantes, and the 1 and 2 euros depict the effigy of King Juan Carlos I or King Felipe VI.

Banknotes 

In 1874, the Bank of Spain (Banco de España in Spanish) introduced notes for Pts 25, Pts 50, Pts 100, Pts 500 and Pts 1,000. Except for the Pts 250 notes only issued in 1878, the denominations produced by the Central Bank of Spain did not change until the Civil War, when both the Republicans and Nationalists issued Bank of Spain notes.

In 1936, the Republicans issued Pts 5 and Pts 10 notes. The Ministry of Finance (Ministerio de Hacienda) introduced notes for 50 cts, Pta 1 and Pts 2 in 1938, as well as issuing stamp money (consisting of postage or revenue stamps affixed to cardboard discs) in denominations of 5 cts, 10 cts, 15 cts, 20 cts, 25 cts, 30 cts, 40 cts, 45 cts, 50 cts and 60 cts.

The first Nationalist Bank of Spain issues were made in 1936, in denominations of Pts 5, Pts 10, Pts 25, Pts 50, Pts 100, Pts 500, and Pts 1,000. Pta 1 and Pts 2 notes were added in 1937. From the mid-1940s, denominations issued were Pta 1, Pts 5, Pts 25, Pts 50, Pts 100, Pts 500, and Pts 1,000. The Pta 1, Pts 5, Pts 25, and Pts 50 were all replaced by coins by the late 1950s.

In 1978, Pts 5,000 notes were introduced. The Pts 100 note was replaced by a coin in 1982, with Pts 1,000 notes introduced in 1983, Pts 200 in 1984 and Pts 10,000 in 1987. The Pts 200 and Pts 500 notes were replaced by coins in 1986 and 1987.

The final series of banknotes were introduced between 1982 and 1987 and remained legal tender until the introduction of the Euro.

{|class="wikitable" style="font-size:95%"
! Image !! Value !! Equivalent in euros (€) !! Dimensions !! Main colour !! Portrait
|-
|align="center" | || Pts 200 || 1.20 || 120 × 65 mm ||  Orange || Leopoldo Alas
|-
|align="center" | || Pts 500 || 3.01 || 129 × 70 mm ||  Dark blue || Rosalía de Castro
|-
|align="center" | || Pts 1,000 || 6.01 || 138 × 75 mm ||  Green || Benito Pérez Galdós
|-
|align="center" | || Pts 2,000 || 12.02 || 147 × 80 mm ||  Red || Juan Ramón Jiménez
|-
|align="center" | || Pts 5,000 || 30.05 || 156 × 85 mm ||  Brown || Juan Carlos I of Spain
|-
|align="center" | || Pts 10,000 || 60.10 || 165 × 85 mm ||  Gray || Juan Carlos I of Spain and Felipe, Prince of Asturias
|}

The last banknotes series (1992) was:

{|class="wikitable" style="font-size:95%"
! Image !! Value !! Equivalent in euros (€) !! Dimensions !! Main colour !! Portrait
|-
|align="center" | || Pts 1,000 || 6.01 || 130 × 65 mm ||  Green || Hernán Cortés and Francisco Pizarro
|-
|align="center" | || Pts 2,000 || 12.02 || 138 × 68 mm ||  Red || José Celestino Mutis
|-
|align="center" | [9]|| Pts 5,000 || 30.05 || 146 × 71 mm ||  Brown || Christopher Columbus
|-
|align="center" | [10]|| Pts 10,000 || 60.10 || 154 × 74 mm ||  Gray || Juan Carlos I of Spain and Jorge Juan y Santacilia
|}

Andorran peseta 
The Andorran peseta (ADP) (pesseta in Catalan) was pegged at 1:1 to the Spanish peseta. Following the outbreak of the Spanish Civil War on 17 July 1936, the Andorran General Council issued Decree No. 112 of 19 December 1936, authorizing the issuance of paper money backed by Spanish banknotes.

Replacement by the euro 

The peseta was replaced by the euro on 1 January 1999 on currency exchange boards. Euro coins and notes were introduced in January 2002, and on 1 March 2002 the peseta lost its legal tender status in Spain, and also in Andorra. The conversion rate was €1 = Pts 166.386.

Peseta notes issued since 1939 and coins that were legal tender on 31 December 2001 remained exchangeable at any branch of the Spanish Central Bank until 30 June 2021. According to that entity, as of March 2011 pesetas to a value estimated at €1.7 billion had not been converted to euros.

See also 
 Commemorative coins of Spain
 Currency of Spanish America
 Economy of Spain
 Euro (since 1999)
 European Union (since 1957)
 Equatorial Guinean peseta
 Latin Monetary Union (1865–1927)
 Latin Union (since 1954)
 Philippine real
 Sahrawi peseta
 Spanish euro coins

Notes 

  1999 by law (on financial markets and business transactions only), two currency units were used (the Spanish peseta still had legal tender on all banknotes, coins and personal bank accounts) until 2002.

References

Bibliography

External links 

 Overview of the peseta from the BBC
 Banco de España (Bank of Spain): last peseta issues
 Historical banknotes of Spain 

1868 establishments in Spain
2002 disestablishments in Spain
Currencies of Spain
Currencies replaced by the euro
Currencies of Andorra
Modern obsolete currencies
Coins of Spain
Currency symbols